Nick Stevens (born January 31, 1995) is an American football quarterback who is currently a free agent. He played college football at Colorado State, where he was the starting quarterback from 2015 to 2017. He was signed as an undrafted free agent by the Denver Broncos in 2018.

Career
Stevens attended Vista Murrieta High School in Murrieta, California and played college football at Colorado State University. After redshirting his first year at Colorado State in 2013, he played in five games as Garrett Grayson's backup in 2014. He became the starter in 2015 and remained the starter throughout the rest of his career. Stevens finished his career with 8,554 yards, 70 touchdowns and 27 interceptions.

Before the 2018 NFL Draft, Stevens worked out with the Green Bay Packers as a Quarterback.

After going undrafted in the 2018 NFL Draft, Stevens signed with the Denver Broncos. The Broncos released him in June 2018.

See also
2015 Arizona Bowl
2017 New Mexico Bowl
2016 Famous Idaho Potato Bowl

References

External links
Colorado State Rams bio

1995 births
Living people
American football quarterbacks
Colorado State Rams football players
Denver Broncos players
People from Murrieta, California
People from Poway, California
Players of American football from California
Sportspeople from Riverside County, California
Sportspeople from San Diego County, California